Helen Virginia Horton (November 21, 1923 – September 28, 2007) was an American actress. She was born in Chicago and had a brief career in New York. She married Hamish Thomson and lived near London. She worked extensively in British television, radio and theatre, and had three children; her granddaughter is the English actress Lily James. Horton voiced the ship's computer, "Mother", in the 1979 film Alien.

Early life
Horton attended Northwestern University where she became lifelong friends with Patricia Neal (Helen Benson in The Day the Earth Stood Still). She was well thought of in the drama department and was cast as Viola, the lead role in Twelfth Night, with Neal cast as Olivia, in a university production of the Shakespeare play.

In September 1945, Horton and Neal took a shared apartment in New York and looked for work. They both got parts in a production of Seven Mirrors at the Blackfriars Theatre.

Career

Horton took over from Vivien Leigh as Blanche in A Streetcar Named Desire after the play's London run was completed and it began to tour the United Kingdom. When Neal mentioned the connection to Leigh, she remarked "No one takes over for me, dear. When I leave a play, it's over."

Filmography
 Sie fanden eine Heimat (1953) – Miss Sullivan
 Strange Stories (1953) – Marie
 Sunday Night Theatre (1953–1959, BBC series, 5 episodes) – Ann Wesfield / Dorothy Stafford / Kendall Frayne / Lily Miller / Estelle Quinn
 The Battle of the River Plate (1956) – (uncredited) 
 Let's Be Happy (1957, musical film) – Sadie Whitelaw
 The Mark of the Hawk (1957, drama film also known as The Accused) – Barbara Craig
 Never Take Sweets from a Stranger (1960) – Sylvia Kingsley
 Play of the Week (1959–1967, ITV series, 5 episodes) – Mollie / Mona / Mrs. Barker / Mrs. Storch / Sonia Chance
 The Last Shot You Hear (1969) – Dodie Rubens
 The Chairman (1969) – Susan Wright
 The Dick Emery Show (1971–1981, BBC series, 4 episodes)
 Endless Night (1972, crime film) – Aunt Beth
 Phase IV (1974) – Mildred Eldridge
 Nido de viudas (1977) – Ana
 Alien (1979) – Mother (voice)
 Superman III (1983) – Miss Henderson
 The Benny Hill Show, 1979–1986, ITV series 6 episodes
 The Razor's Edge (1984) – Red Cross lady
 Ellis Island (1984, CBC, 3 episodes) – Miss Pringle
 Reunion at Fairborough (1985, TV film)
 Miss Marple (1987, BBC, 1 episode) – Mrs. Cabot
 Bullseye! (1990) – Tourist on Coach

References

External links
 

1923 births
2007 deaths
Actresses from Chicago
20th-century American women
20th-century American people
21st-century American women